Gorazd Škof (born 11 July 1977) is a retired Slovenian handball player. He made a total of 188 appearances for Slovenia and represented the team in several major tournaments, including the 2016 Summer Olympics.

References

External links 
 
 
 
 

1977 births
Living people
Sportspeople from Novo Mesto
Slovenian male handball players
RK Zagreb players
Expatriate handball players
Slovenian expatriate sportspeople in Croatia
Slovenian expatriate sportspeople in France
Slovenian expatriate sportspeople in Germany
Slovenian expatriate sportspeople in Austria
Olympic handball players of Slovenia
Handball players at the 2016 Summer Olympics
Handball-Bundesliga players